The TK85 was a ZX81 clone made by Microdigital Eletrônica, a computer company located in Brazil. It came with 16 or 48 KB RAM, and had a ZX Spectrum–style case, similar to a Timex Sinclair 1500.

Unlike the ZX81, the TK85 used discrete logic circuits instead of a ULA, and during manufacture several chips were scraped so that competitors couldn't copy the circuit. The circuit board had space for a AY-3-8912 sound generator chip (compatible with the ZonX-81 sound board), and although none came factory installed, it is possible to add the necessary circuits.

The TK85 came with a copy of the 8K ZX81 floating point BASIC, and an additional 2K EPROM, mapped to addresses 8192-10240, containing machine code routines for use with tape files. These routines could save (HISAVE), load (HILOAD) and verify (HIVERIFY) in "Hi-Speed" (4200 bps); save and load, BASIC variables in 300 bps (standard ZX81 speed) using DSAVE and DLOAD functions and 4200 bps (Hi-Speed) using DHSAVE and DHLOAD. These routines were all accessible using RAND USR commands. The save to variable function could be used to make copies of programs on tape.

The expansion port on the back of the computer is compatible with the ZX81, although some peripherals may not work due to conflicts with the 2K of extra ROM.

Since the joystick used the cursor keys, and due to the circuitry for the keyboard, it wasn't possible to detect diagonal directions correctly.

Bibliography

Books

Other sources

References

External links 
 Microdigital TK85

Microdigital Eletrônica 
Goods manufactured in Brazil
Sinclair ZX81 clones